Gary Ross (born November 3, 1956) is an American film director, writer, and producer. He is best known for writing and directing the fantasy comedy-drama film Pleasantville (1998), the sports drama film Seabiscuit (2003), the sci-fi action film The Hunger Games (2012), and the heist comedy film Ocean's 8 (2018). Ross has been nominated for four Academy Awards.

Early life and career
Ross was born in Los Angeles, California, the son of Gail and Arthur A. Ross, an Oscar-nominated screenwriter (Brubaker). His family is Jewish. He attended (though did not graduate from) the University of Pennsylvania, worked as a fisherman, worked on Ted Kennedy's 1980 Presidential campaign, consulted on both Michael Dukakis 1988 presidential campaign's and Bill Clinton's presidential campaigns, and wrote a novel before being hired to write screenplays for Paramount Pictures.

Career
Big was his first produced screenplay. Co-written with Anne Spielberg (sister of Steven), it led to an Academy Award nomination and a Writers Guild of America Award.  He went on to write several other successful films, including Dave in 1993.  In 1998, he wrote and directed Pleasantville, and in 2003, he wrote, directed and produced Seabiscuit, based on Seabiscuit: An American Legend by Laura Hillenbrand. The film earned seven Academy Award nominations.

Ross took on the high-profile project of co-adapting and directing the film adaptation of the first book in Suzanne Collins's Hunger Games trilogy. The film was released on March 23, 2012, and earned $672.8 million worldwide. Although the movie was financially and critically successful, Ross opted to not adapt or direct the sequels, citing the rushed production schedule as his main reason.

Ross also wrote and produced the animated feature The Tale of Despereaux, based on the Newbery Medal-winning children's book by Kate DiCamillo. His first book, Bartholomew Biddle and the Very Big Wind, was published by Candlewick Press in 2012. A children's book, it is written completely in verse.

His next two films as a director and writer were the period drama Free State of Jones (2016) and the heist film Ocean's 8 (2018).

Filmography

Awards and nominations

References

External links

 

1956 births
Living people
University of Pennsylvania alumni
American male screenwriters
Writers from Los Angeles
Film directors from Los Angeles
Film producers from California
Screenwriters from California